Technological University (Kyaing Tong) is in Kengtung Township, East Shan State, Myanmar with an area of 38.38 acres. It was formerly opened as Government Technological Institute (GTI) in 1999 and then promoted as Government Technological College (GTC) in 2001. It was upgraded to university level as Technological University in 2007.

Departments 
Civil Engineering Department
Electronics and Communications Department Department
Electrical Power Engineering Department
Mechanical Engineering Department
Academic Department

Programs

See also
Technological University, Taunggyi
Technological University, Lashio
Technological University, Loikaw
Technological University, Panglong
List of Technological Universities in Myanmar

External links 

Technological universities in Myanmar
Universities and colleges in Shan State